The All Pakistan Muttahida Students Organization (APMSO) is a Pakistani student organization notable for creating a political party: the Mohajir Quami Movement, now called the Muttahida Qaumi Movement (MQM).

APMSO was founded by Altaf Hussain along with other students including Azeem Ahmed Tariq, Dr. Imran Farooq on Sunday, 11 June 1978 at Karachi University. Hussain also  served as a 1st Chairman of organization while Azeem Ahmed Tariq served as 1st General Secretary of the organization.

Creation of APMSO & Philosophy 
On 11 June 1978 All Pakistan Mohair Students Organization (APMSO) was created by Altaf Hussain and others to provide the university students a way to fight injustice. It became popular among students of Karachi University. APMSO won student union election in 1980's.

Many leaders rose from APMSO Azeem Ahmed Tariq, Imran Farooq, Farooq Sattar, Ishrat ul Ebad, Haider Abbas Rizvi and many others.

According to APMSO website the philosophy of APMSO & Muttahida Qaumi Movement is Realism and Practicalism.

Mohajir identity 

Mohajirs had never liked the idea of identifying themselves with Sindhi population on the basis of ethnicity or nationality and were always hostile of "Sindhi nationalism" instead of "ethnic nationalism." But Ethno-nationalist politicians convinced them that circumstances needed them to seek their identity on ethnic lines. The Muhajir sense of isolation came into being through a series of events. The three most important being the 1964 presidential elections, the 1972 language riots, and the post-1985 ethnic clashes between Muhajirs and non-Muhajirs in Karachi. "During the December 1964 presidential elections, the Muhajir population of Karachi experienced a wrath of a Pathan backlash when Gohar Ayub Khan, son of President Ayub Khan, launched a series of attacks on Muhajir communities because of their support for Fatimah Jinnah, the sister of Mohammad Ali Jinnah, against Ayub Khan." Though Gohar Ayub's intentions were to target those who opposed his father, ethno-nationalists portrayed the move as specifically targeting Muhajirs At this time Ayub Khan moved the federal capital from Karachi to Islamabad, causing further anger amongst the elite of the Muhajir community, especially the bureaucracy.

The 1972 language riots were caused by the passage of a language bill by the Sindhi Assembly declaring Sindhi to be the provincial language along with Urdu. The making of Sindhi as an equal language to Urdu for official purposes frustrated the elite of the Muhajir community as it disfavored their hegemony over the region.

In June 1978 the All Pakistan Muhajir Student Organization was formed and it took on the task of creating a sense of distinction amongst Muhajir youth, on linguistic line, from the rest of Pakistanis. From the APMSO, in March 1984, was created the Muhajir Qaumi Movement. Now called the Muttahida Qaumi Movement (MQM), its leader declares its ideology to be based on Realism and Practicalism. "Acceptance of reality with an open heart is Realism, a concept based upon the philosophy of its Founder and Leader Mr. Altaf Hussain. Based on Realism positive achievement made through ideologically supported pragmatic programs is called Practicalism."

APMSO to MQM 
From the early days APMSO faced many attacks by the Thunder Squad of Islami Jamiat Talaba (IJT). Jamiat has feared to loss its strong hold in university by APMSO. Therefore, the Leadership of Islami Jamiat Talaba gives task to its notorious "Thunder Squared" which is led by Munawar Hasan to remove APMSO and its leadership from university.

In 1981 Thunder Squad attack by knives and revolver on stalls of APMSO at university gates and badly wounded 16 members of APMSO including founder of APMSO Altaf Hussain and then the squad entry of APMSO in university.

Subsequently, Hussain decided to establish a National Political Party for Mohajir and then he found Mohajir Qaumi Movement (MQM) on 18 March 1984. MQM also achieve success as APMSO and in very short time, the philosophy of Altaf Hussain and MQM spread all over Sindh especially in Karachi, Hyderabad, Mirpurkhas, Nawabshah and Sukker.

Re-Engineering Pakistan Exhibition 2011

Announcement in a Press Conference  

On June, 6th 2011, Chairman of All Pakistan Muttahida Students Organization Engr. Farhan Shams announce to organize three days science exhibition "Re-engineering Pakistan" by the Academic & Social Circle with the collaboration of APMSO. With aimed to bringing out the talents of Pakistani students and to give them an environment conducive for a better future. The APMSO had organized this exhibition in keeping with its past traditions and it would continue to hold such constructive programs for the betterment of the student community. He said this while addressing a press conference at the Karachi Press Club. He was accompanied by vice chairman Abdul Wahab, Secretary General Shabbir Babar Ali, Ahsan Ghouri and Isra Tufail.

Projects made by students and professionals regarding social sciences, engineering and medical sciences will be displayed in the exhibition. The projects relating to solar energy drone, and submarine technology would also be on the display in the exhibition.

He said that it was because in the light of the guidelines given by Mr. Altaf Hussain that the APMSO was organizing "Re-engineering Pakistan" exhibition at Karachi Expo Centre from 7 June to 9 June. The importance of the exhibition can be gauged from the fact that more than 500 institutions of higher education and learning were taking part in this exhibition and more than 300 projects would be displayed.

1st Day of Exhibition & Opening Ceremony 

7 June 2011, the three days "Re-engineering Pakistan" exhibition started today in Karachi Expo Centre under Academic and Social Circle, a subsidiary social wing of All Pakistan Muttahida Students Organization. The exhibition was opened by member of the Co-ordination Committee Ms. Nasrin Jalil and Provincial Minister for Industries Mr. Rauf Siddiqui. Member Co-ordination Committee Wasay Jalil, Kunwar Khalid Yunus, Qasim Ali Raza, Salim Tajik, Dr. Sagheer Ahmed, vice-chancellor Karachi University Dr. Pirzada Qasim Siddiqui office-bearers of AMPSO and a large number of other dignitaries from industry were also present on the occasion.

More than 250 stalls from various educational institutions including NED University, Karachi University, Federal Urdu University, Hamdard University, Sindh Medical College, Karachi Medical and Dental College, Sir Syed University, Jinnah University for Women, Muhammad Ali Jinnah University and S M Law College were put up in the exhibition.

Visitors exhibited keen interest in projects relating to solar energy, electric-powered card, primitive form of drone, aero-plane, robots, traffic signals and other interesting projects made by the students of various universities.

2nd Day of Exhibition 

8 June 2011, The Founder and Leader of Muttahida Quami Movement (MQM) Mr. Altaf Hussain have appreciated the efforts of the central committee of All Pakistan Muttahida Students Organization (APMSO) and Academic and Social Circle for successfully holding the "Re-engineering Pakistan" exhibition at the Karachi Expo Centre. He also commended the students who took active part in the exhibition.

Mr. Hussain appealed to the teaching community and the scientists to visit the exhibition guide the students in making their work fruitful for the country. He announced three cash prizes of one lack, fifty thousand and twenty five thousand for the students that would be judged first, second and third respectively. The prizes will be given on the last day of the exhibition.

Meanwhile, Deputy Convener of Co-ordination Committee and Federal Minister for Overseas Pakistanis Dr Farooq Sattar visited the expo centre today and gave a press briefing about the exhibition. Dr Sattar said that our youths had the ability to take the country ahead in the 21st century. Mr. Altaf Hussain, the APMSO and the Academic and Social Circle had proved that nothing was impossible if the intentions were pure.

3rd Day of Exhibition 
9 June 2011, The Founder and Leader of Muttahida Quami Movement (MQM) Mr. Altaf Hussain was addressing a large gathering of students, young professionals, educationists, scientists, economists, representatives of corporate sector and others belonging to different walks of life at the closing ceremony of the "Re-engineering Pakistan" exhibition held by Academic and Social Circle, a social wing of All Pakistan Muttahida Students Organizations. Members of the Co-ordination Committee of the MQM were also present on the occasion.

Mr. Hussain praised the central committee of the APMSO on organizing the "Re-engineering Pakistan" exhibition and said that if the students were supported by the government Pakistan would not need to ask the US for the drone technology.

Karachi University and Youth Politics 
Karachi University has been the hub of student political activity for many decades. "Student politics were born with the formation of Islami Jamiat Talba (IJT) and the Democratic Students' Federation (DSF) in 1948." Since then, numerous student political groups have emerged throughout the country representing different races, ethnicities, cultures, and ideologies.

"In the first few decades of Pakistan's existence, student politics was a symbol of the students' socio-political awareness." But change was quick and drastic, especially in the 1980s and 1990s. "Karachi University, like its host city, has always been a melting pot for students from all over the country. Its grounds have seen the spirited expression of various socio-political schools of thought, the gradual desensitisation of students after the military takeover of 1979 as well as the violent military crackdown on the APMSO-PSF conflict in 1993 that was followed by the indefinite deployment of Rangers on campus." In April 1984 General Zia Ul-Haq imposed a ban on all student organizations throughout the country, which prohibited the "formation and continuance" of student unions and stipulated a punishment of violators of the regulation by rigorous imprisonment up to five years, by a fine, or by both.

Although political parties still exist on campus, authorities deny their presence. Because of the constant rise in violence, the number of student political activists has dropped tremendously. Today parents "fearfully raise their children to mind their own business, study to build careers, not ideologies and lead safe, peaceful lives in sheltered cocoons. While student attendance may be full at academic, entertainment, or sports events organized by these parties, for any other events, students hesitate."

Despite constant condemnation by university administration, media and even the general student body, these parties maintain that they still have a role to play in society. Some students attribute this intolerance to the intolerance of university authorities for students' expressions against injustice.
In charge of APMSO's KU wing, adds to the case for political restoration of students, "We propose the restoration of a student union that has equal participation from all students. What we want is a students' parliament accommodating all the students in a peaceful, free environment."

According to the APMSO's KU Organizer, the alleged party workers had in fact nothing to do with APMSO, and that there have been numerous cases of students belonging to certain ethnic groups using the APMSO name to get out of attending classes. He insisted that his party strongly condemns students' missing classes for any reason. However, he does agree that security threats are indeed an issue and that the party has in the past requested the administration to provide security to some workers threatened by rival parties persisting to destroy the peace of the university.

NAQEEB 
This is a quarterly Urdu magazine featuring articles, reports, poetries and other materials which is in interest of students. Naqeeb is publishing by Gehwara-e-Adab with the collaboration of APMSO from the head-office of Gehwara-e-Adab. NAQEEB is quite popular among students. The meaning of NAQEEB is "Harbinger".

References

External links

1978 establishments in Pakistan
Ethnic organisations based in Pakistan
Students' federations of Pakistan
Student wings of political parties in Pakistan
Muttahida Qaumi Movement
Student organizations established in 1978
Muhajir nationalism